Megathrips is a genus of thrips in the family Phlaeothripidae.

Species
 Megathrips antennatus
 Megathrips brevis
 Megathrips elegans
 Megathrips flavipes
 Megathrips inermis
 Megathrips lativentris
 Megathrips timidus

References

Phlaeothripidae
Thrips
Thrips genera